Anoplodesmus is a genus of millipedes. It is one of the most species rich genera in the family Paradoxosomatidae, with over 40 described species distributed from India and Nepal to China and Southeast Asia, as well as the Mascarene Islands and Fiji.

Species

 Anoplodesmus affinis (Golovatch, 1990)
Anoplodesmus anichkini Golovatch & Semenyuk, 2010
Anoplodesmus anthracinus Pocock, 1895
Anoplodesmus aspinosus Chen, Golovatch, Mikhajlova & Chang, 2010
Anoplodesmus attemsi Verhoeff, 1930
Anoplodesmus attemsii Verhoeff, 1930
Anoplodesmus borealis Nguyen, 2010
Anoplodesmus chinensis Golovatch, 2013
Anoplodesmus cylindricus (Carl, 1935)
Anoplodesmus dasys (Chamberlin, 1920)
Anoplodesmus dyscheres Attems, 1898
Anoplodesmus elongissimus (Golovatch, 1984)
Anoplodesmus humberti (Carl, 1902)
Anoplodesmus inornatus (Humbert, 1865)
Anoplodesmus insignis Attems, 1936
Anoplodesmus kathanus (Chamberlin, 1921)
Anoplodesmus kelaarti (Humbert, 1865)
Anoplodesmus layardi (Humbert, 1865)
Anoplodesmus loebli Golovatch, 2000
Anoplodesmus luctuosus (Peters, 1864)
Anoplodesmus magnus Golovatch, 2015
Anoplodesmus malayanus Golovatch, 1993
Anoplodesmus martensi (Golovatch, 1990)
Anoplodesmus mirabilis Golovatch, VandenSpiegel & Semenyuk, 2016
Anoplodesmus obesus Pocock, 1895
Anoplodesmus perplexus (Golovatch, 1993)
Anoplodesmus pinguis Pocock, 1895
Anoplodesmus rufocinctus (Carl, 1932)
Anoplodesmus sabulosus Attems, 1898
Anoplodesmus saussurii (Humbert, 1865)
Anoplodesmus schawalleri  (Golovatch, 1990)
Anoplodesmus similis (Golovatch, 1990)
Anoplodesmus simplex (Humbert, 1865)
Anoplodesmus solenophorus Nguyen, 2010
Anoplodesmus solitarius Carl, 1909
Anoplodesmus spectabilis (Karsch, 1881)
Anoplodesmus spiniger Chen, Golovatch, Mikhajlova & Chang, 2010
Anoplodesmus splendidus (Verhoeff, 1936)
Anoplodesmus striolatus Pocock, 1895
Anoplodesmus subcylindricus (Carl, 1932)
Anoplodesmus tanjoricus (Pocock, 1892)
Anoplodesmus tarmani Mršić, 1996
Anoplodesmus thwaitesii (Humbert, 1865)
Anoplodesmus ursula (Attems, 1936)

References

Polydesmida
Millipedes of Asia
Taxa named by R. I. Pocock
Millipede genera